James Sterling may refer to:

James Sterling (poet) (1701–1763), Church of England clergyman and poet
James E. Sterling (1838–unknown), United States Navy sailor and Medal of Honor recipient
Jim Sterling, English-American video game journalist

See also 
James Stirling (disambiguation)
Sterling (disambiguation)